Soul 2 is the eighth studio album by British soul/R&B singer Seal. The album was released on 4 November 2011. Like its predecessor, Soul (2008) the album consists of soul classics, and it was produced by David Foster, Jochem van der Saag, and long-time collaborator Trevor Horn. It was preceded by the lead single, "Let's Stay Together" on 30 September 2011.

In the United Kingdom, Soul 2 peaked at number 17 on the UK Albums Chart. As of January 2012, the album has sold 114,654 copies in the UK. In the United States, the album debuted at No. 8 with 27,000 copies sold in the first week. It has sold 115,000 copies in the US as of October 2015.

Background

Following the worldwide success of 2008 cover album Soul, Seal teamed up with producers David Foster and Trevor Horn in London and Los Angeles to record Soul 2. The album mainly consists of classic soul songs from the 1970s by artists such as Marvin Gaye, Bill Withers, Al Green, and Teddy Pendergrass. Seal also recorded Bob Dylan's "Like a Rolling Stone", but it did not end up on the album. In a press release, Seal said of the album: "In my twenty years on a journey in the music industry, two things remain constants, the voice and more importantly, the song. I continue to make music because of the chance that this day could indeed be the day I write another great song or have the opportunity to sing one. The songs on Soul 2 are a natural evolution in the arc of soul music from the songs on the first Soul album -- and they are all-time classics."

The album cover photo was taken by Seal's friend & photography blogger, Steve Huff, during Seal's performance in Paris.

Critical reception

Metacritic gave the album 70 out of 100 based on 5 critic reviews as of May 2012. Caroline Sullivan of The Guardian gave the album four out of five stars writing, "His voice and interpretive skills are such, though, that most tracks fit him like a glove, to the point where, on Rose Royce's "Wishing on a Star", his oak-aged vocal seems a better fit for the remorseful lyric than original singer Gwen Dickey's." BBC Music's Mike Diver gave the album a positive review commenting that "there's nothing bad to be said for Soul 2, and with [Trevor] Horn on production everything shines brightly like the first snowflakes of a new winter. Seal the songwriter might never hit the heights of the early 1990s again – but Seal the singer can still hold his own amongst today's clutch of contemporary soul stars." Andy Gill of The Independent felt that the cover versions were too faithful to the originals, while calling Seal's voice "a natural fit" and the arrangements "impeccable".

Track listing

Notes
 (*) denotes co-producer

Personnel
Seal – vocals
Frank Ricotti – percussion, vibraphone
Chris Bruce – acoustic guitar, bass guitar, electric guitar
Jamie Muhoberac – keyboards, synthesizer, programming, percussion, melodica
Phil Palmer – electric guitar
Ash Soan – drums, percussion
David Foster – keyboards
Victor Indrizzo – drums
Lol Creme – electric guitar
Trevor Horn – bass guitar, backing vocals, acoustic guitar, melodica
Jimmie Wood – backing vocals
Alex Acuña – percussion
Julian Hinton – keyboards, programming, piano
Aaron Horn – drum programming
Jochem van der Saag – synthesizer, programming
Dan Higgins – saxophone
Graham Archer – percussion
Leo Abrahams – electric guitar
Pete Murray – keyboards, piano, organ
Jerry Hey – Orchestral & Brass arrangements

Charts

Weekly charts

Year-end charts

Certifications

Release history

References

External links

2011 albums
Seal (musician) albums
Warner Records albums
Albums produced by David Foster
Albums produced by Trevor Horn
Covers albums
Sequel albums